This is a list of the best-known Slovenian computer scientists.

B
 Vladimir Batagelj (1948–)
 Ivan Bratko (1946–)

J
 Primož Jakopin

L
 Ivo Lah (1896–1979)
 Jure Leskovec

M
 Andrej Mrvar

P
 Marko Petkovšek (1955–)
 Tomaž Pisanski (1949–) 
 Bogdan Pogorelc

T
 Denis Trček (1965–)

V
 Jurij Vega (1754–1802)

Z
 Egon Zakrajšek (1941–2002)
 Aleš Žiberna

See also
List of Slovenians

References

Computer scientists

Slovenian